Mateu Jaume Morey Bauzà (born 2 March 2000) is a Spanish professional footballer who plays as a right-back for Bundesliga club Borussia Dortmund.

Club career

Early career
Born in Petra, Majorca, Balearic Islands, Morey joined FC Barcelona's La Masia in June 2015, after representing RCD Mallorca, CE Manacor and hometown side UE Petra. He helped Barça win the 2017–18 UEFA Youth League, featuring in five matches during the competition.

Morey was promoted to the B-team for the 2018–19 campaign, but suffered a serious knee injury in August 2018 which kept him sidelined until the following March. After rejecting a contract renewal from the Catalans, he was separated from the squad, and subsequently also suffered another knee injury which kept him out for nearly two months.

Borussia Dortmund
On 1 July 2019, free agent Morey agreed to a five-year contract with Bundesliga side Borussia Dortmund. After initially playing for the reserves in the Regionalliga West, he made his professional debut on 31 May 2020, coming on as a late substitute for Achraf Hakimi in a 6–1 away routing of SC Paderborn 07.

Morey made his UEFA Champions League debut on 4 November 2020, replacing Thomas Meunier in a 3–0 away success over Club Brugge KV.

On 1 May 2021, Morey suffered a serious injury to his knee after landing awkwardly following a tackle in a DFB Pokal match against Holstein Kiel. He missed the remainder of the 2020–21 season as well as the 2021–22 season.

International career
Morey represented Spain at under-17 level in the 2017 UEFA European Under-17 Championship and the 2017 FIFA U-17 World Cup, being a regular starter in both tournaments as his side won the former and finished second in the latter. He also played for the nation's under-16 and under-18 sides in 2016 and 2018, respectively.

Career statistics

Notes

Honours
Barcelona
UEFA Youth League: 2017–18
Borussia Dortmund
DFB-Pokal: 2020–21

Spain U17
UEFA European Under-17 Championship: 2017

References

External links
 Profile at the Borussia Dortmund website
 
 

2000 births
Living people
Footballers from Mallorca
Spanish footballers
Association football fullbacks
FC Barcelona Atlètic players
Bundesliga players
Regionalliga players
Borussia Dortmund II players
Borussia Dortmund players
Spain youth international footballers
Spanish expatriate footballers
Spanish expatriate sportspeople in Germany
Expatriate footballers in Germany